Myung-soo is a Korean masculine given name. Its meaning differs based on the hanja used to write each syllable of the name. There are 19 hanja with the reading "myung" and 67 hanja with the reading "soo" on the South Korean government's official list of hanja which may be registered for use in given names. 

People with this name include:
Ri Myong-su (born 1937), North Korean security official;
Park Myeong-su (born 1970), South Korean comedian;
Kim Myung-soo (born 1992), stage name L (South Korean singer), member of South Korean boy band Infinite. 
Fictional characters with this name include:
Dong Myung-soo, in 2013 South Korean film The Berlin File.

See also
List of Korean given names

References

Korean masculine given names